RV-11 is the Van's Aircraft designation for a proposed single-seat touring motor glider design similar in layout to the AMS Carat. The prototype RV-11 uses the wings of an HP-18 sailplane mated to a specially built fuselage.

References

 Van’s Aircraft website

External links
Van's Aircraft

Homebuilt aircraft
Proposed aircraft of the United States
RV-11
Motor gliders
Low-wing aircraft
Single-engined tractor aircraft